Woodsia obtusa, the bluntlobe cliff fern, is a common rock fern of Appalachia and eastern North America.  It prefers a calcareous substrate, but also grows in neutral soils.  It may grow on rock faces or in scree.

This fern is often confused with various ferns of the genus Cystopteris but is distinguished by its hairy nature.

References

obtusa
Ferns of Canada
Ferns of the United States
Plants described in 1840